The hooded yellowthroat (Geothlypis nelsoni) is a species of bird in the family Parulidae. It is endemic to the highlands of Mexico north of the Isthmus of Tehuantepec. It is resident in dense semiarid to humid montane shrubland or chaparral.

References

hooded yellowthroat
Birds of Mexico
Endemic birds of Mexico
hooded yellowthroat
hooded yellowthroat
Taxonomy articles created by Polbot